An online auction (also electronic auction, e-auction, virtual auction, or eAuction) is an auction held over the internet and accessed by internet connected devices. Similar to in-person auctions, online auctions come in a variety of types, with different bidding and selling rules.

The e-commerce and online auction industry, measured by revenue, was $995.8 billion in 2023. eCommerce sales for businesses have been steadily increasing for years, and with the migration of virtually all transactions to digital due to the COVID Pandemic, worldwide sales through ecommerce sales channels such as websites and online marketplaces increased overall in 2020.

There are two primary markets for online auctions: business to business (B2B) and business to consumer (B2C). B2C is forecast to have over a 1% annual growth rate, achieving a nearly 22% share of total global retail sales by 2024. B2B ecommerce gross merchandise value showed a similarly steady rate through 2019, as to mirror its retail B2C counterpart.

The largest consumer-to-consumer online auction site is eBay, which researchers suggest is popular because it is a convenient, efficient, and effective method for buying and selling goods.

Despite the benefits of online auctions, the anonymity of the internet, the large market, and the ease of access makes online auction fraud easier than in traditional auctions. The FTC categorizes online auction fraud reports with online shopping categories.

History
Online auctions originated on web forums as early as 1979 on CompuServe and The Source, as well as through email and bulletin board systems. Auctioneers and sellers would post notices describing items for sale, minimum bids, and closing times. As the popularity of online auctions grew, websites dedicated to the practice began to appear in 1995 when two auction sites were founded. The first online auction site was Onsale.com, founded by Jerry Kaplan in May 1995. Onsale's business model had the company act as the seller. 

In September of 1995, eBay was founded by French-Iranian computer scientist Pierre Omidyar using a different approach to online auctions by facilitating person-to-person transactions. This was a popular choice with consumers, leading eBay to become the largest e-commerce site in the early 2000s.

Benefits of Online Auctions 
A core benefit of an online auction is the removal of the physical limitations of a traditional auction that requires attendees to be geographically located together which greatly reduces audience reach. 

Online auctions offer advantages to users that traditional auction formats do not offer such as the use of automated bids, using search engines to find items, and the ability for users to view items by categories. Along with these benefits, online auctions have greatly increased the variety of goods and services that can be bought and sold in an auction format.

Types

English auctions

English auctions are also known as open outcry or raise prices. In live settings, English auctions  are announced by either an auctioneer or by the bidders, and winners pay what they bid to receive the object. English auctions are the most common third-party online auction format and are known for their simplicity. The format is popular due to its ease-of-use in an online environment (since computers are capable of tracking and awarding an auction to the highest bidder).

Reverse auction
Reverse auctions are where the roles of buyer and seller are reversed. Multiple sellers compete to obtain the buyer's business, and prices typically decrease over time as new offers are made. They do not follow the typical auction format in that the buyer can see all the offers and may choose which they would prefer. Reverse auctions are used predominantly in a business context for procurement. Reverse auctions bring buyers and sellers together in a transparent marketplace. The practice has even been implemented for private jet travel on the online auction site Marmalade Skies.

Bidding fee auction
A bidding fee auction (also known as a penny auction) requires customers to pay for bids, which they can increment an auction price one unit of currency at a time. The most notable bidding fee auction was Swoopo. On English auctions for example, the price goes up in 1 pence (0.01 GBP) increments. 

Critics compare this type of auction to gambling, as users can spend a considerable amount of money without receiving anything in return. The auction owner (typically the owner of the website) makes money in two ways: the purchasing of bids, and the actual amount made from the final cost of the item.

Legalities

Shill bidding 

Shill bidding is the most prominent type of online auction fraud where sellers submit bids to increase the price of an item without intending to win. Shill bidding is also one of the most difficult types of fraud to detect, since it is usually conducted by the seller of the auction in collusion with one or more bidders in the auction. In 2011, a member of eBay became the first individual to be convicted of shill bidding on an auction. By taking part in the process, an individual is breaking the European Union fair trading rules which carries out a fine of up to £5,000 in the United Kingdom.

Shield bidding 
Shield bidding is a technique involving a buyer using another account (called a "shield") to discourage other competitors from bidding by artificially increasing the price and then at the last moment withdrawing their bid to allow the actual buyer to win the auction with a lower price. Most online auction sites don't allow withdrawing bids, therefore making this technique impossible to perform. This technique can still be taken advantage of on sites where this rule is not implemented.

Spotting Shills and Shields 
It is difficult to spot a dirty technique being used by an anonymous or pseudonymous person in online auctions, but it is certainly doable. It can be revealed by examining a seller’s auction history and looking for an account which has bid on every or almost every auction of that seller. If there is someone who meets those characteristics, it is most likely a shill using that account to increase the price.

A shield can be spotted similarly to a shill. By doing a search of a person's won auctions, it can be found out whether or not there is another account participating in the same auctions without ever winning anything. If there is, it is possible that the person is using a shield to help them become successful in auctions.

Fraud
The increasing popularity of using online auctions has led to an increase in fraudulent activity. This is usually performed on an auction website by creating a very appetizing auction, such as a low starting amount. Once a buyer wins an auction and pays for it, the fraudulent seller will either not pursue with the delivery, or send a less valuable version of the purchased item (replicated, used, refurbished, etc.). Protection to prevent such acts has become readily available, most notably PayPal's buyer protection policy. As PayPal handles the transaction, they have the ability to hold funds until a conclusion is drawn whereby the victim can be compensated.

Sale of stolen goods
Online auction websites can be used by thieves or fences to sell stolen goods to unsuspecting buyers. According to police statistics, there were over 8000 crimes involving stolen goods, fraud, or deception reported on eBay in 2009. It has become common practice for organized criminals to steal in-demand items, often in bulk, then selling them online. It is thought to be a safer option than fencing stolen items due to the anonymity and worldwide market it provides. Auction fraud makes up a large percentage of complaints received by the FBI’s Internet Crime Complaint Center (around 63% in 2005 and 45% in 2006).

See also
 Auto auction
 Auction software
 Online travel auction
 Tendering
 Unique bid auction
 Private electronic market

References

External links

 
American inventions
French inventions